Géza M. Tóth (born 16 June 1970) is a filmmaker, PhD university professor and head of KEDD Animation Studio.

Career
He has been active as a film director since 1992.  He has been  teaching from 1994 at some of the most prestigious art universities in Europe, such as MOME - Moholy-Nagy University of Art, Design, Royal College of Art in London, Babeș–Bolyai University and University of Theater and Film Arts in Budapest, where he was the rector from 2014-2019. 
From 2002 he also runs an East-European animation film studios, named KEDD. He is a member of the Academy of Motion Picture Arts and Sciences, and the International Academy of Television Arts and Sciences. 
He is an artist with a wide creative spectrum. He uses various media as well as various tools. Every of his films introduces a new dramaturgical and visual language, and  new animation techniques. His portfolio is built up of films made by traditional animation, 3D animation, stop motion animation.

As a filmmaker he made short films (Maestro, Ergo, Mama, Yes, Icar, The Pied Piper of Hamelin). He made some theatrical productions (Nibelungen - Das Rheingold, Prince Bluebeard’s castle, St. Matthew Passion, XYZ, The Miraculous Mandarin), educational films (The history of Hungarian Opera, Opera130 - The Palace on the Boulevard).

In KEDD Animation Studio - as leader , director and producer - he is working in different kinds of projects (short films, TV-commercials, music videos and experimental works, animation inserts and lots of illustrations in children’s books).

He is the producer of such series for kids as Berry and Dolly and The Kuflis. KEDD Animation Studio also released five feature animated films  in the cinemas: Berry and Dolly - Friends, Berry and Dolly - Gingerbread, Berry and Dolly - Playmates, Berry and Dolly - Fairy Cards, The Kuflis, What’s new, kuflis?

Film, television and theatrical works
1992: The Pied Piper of Hamelin - animated short film (writer, director, visual designer)
1994: Wall Walkers - animated short film (writer, director, visual designer) Kecskemét Animation Festival, 1996
1996: Icarus - animated short film (writer, director, visual designer)
1997: Animation film techniques - report series commissioned by the Public Foundation for the Modernization of Public Education (director, producer)
1997: Television headlines, visual designs commissioned by the Editor-in-Chief of MTV Híradó (director, visual designer)
1998: Music of the Folks - 12-part animated "ID" series commissioned by VIVA + television channel (writer, director, producer)
1998: Sunstroke - 10-part animated "ID" series commissioned by VIVA + television channel (writer, director, producer)
1998: Winter Holidays - 14-part animated "ID" series commissioned by VIVA + television channel (writer, director, producer)
1998: XYZ - total art production (writer, co-director, visual designer)
1999: Living logo - 7-part animated "ID" series commissioned by the VIVA + television channel (writer, director, producer) Kamera Hungária Television Festival, Budapest, 1999
2000: Anytime - 10-part animated "ID" series commissioned by VIVA + television channel (writer, director, producer)
2000: Z plussz - 9-part animated "ID" series commissioned by VIVA + television channel (writer, director, producer)
2000: Do you use your loaf? - 9-part animated "ID" series for the Z + television channel (writer, director, producer)
2000: Come, dear Santa - 10-part animated "ID" series commissioned by the Z + television channel (writer, director, producer)
2001: The Devil Doesn't Sleep - 15-part animated "ID" series commissioned by MATÁV (director, producer)
2001: Same in large - 9-part animated "ID" series commissioned by VIVA + television channel (writer, director, producer)
2001: United channels - 8-part animated "ID" series commissioned by the VIVA + television channel (writer, director, producer)
2002: Stars - 9-part animated "ID" series commissioned by VIVA + television channel (writer, director, producer)
2002: Caution, VIVA! - 9-part animated "ID" series commissioned by VIVA + television channel (writer, director, producer)
2003: Everything is music - 8-part animated "ID" series commissioned by VIVA + television channel (writer, director, producer)
2005: Maestro - animated short film (writer, director, producer)
2006: The Miraculous Mandarin - total art production (director, visual designer)
2006: Bluebeard's Castle  - total art production (director, visual designer)
2008: Modern image tales - 80-part animation series commissioned by Hungarian Television (series director, producer)
2008: Ergo - animated short film (writer, director, producer)
2009: Detti and Wire - animated film series - "Dragon Fire". episode (producer)
2009: Tespi Tales - Animated Film Series - "Stimulated Economy". episode (writer, director, producer)
2009: Mama - short film (writer, director, producer)
2010: Berry and Dolly - 13 Tales - animated film series (co-director, producer)
2010: Berry and Dolly - Friends - animated film (director, producer)
2011: Berry and Dolly - 13 New Tales - animated film series (series director, producer)
2011: Berry and Dolly - Gingerbread - animated film (director, producer)
2012: A Single Matchstick - animated short film (writer, director, producer)
2012: Mr.Dokker - animated short film (producer)
2012: Ferenc Lieb, the painter of Edelény - historical short film commissioned by the L'Huillier-Coburg Castle in Edelény (writer, director, producer)
2013: St Matthew Passion - semi-staged opera performance (director, visual designer)
2013: 7 Significant Day - 7-part total art series commissioned by the Hungarian State Opera House (writer, director, producer)
2013: Yes - short feature film (writer, director)
2013: TWhere the World Unfolds - The History of Hungarian Opera - an educational film commissioned by the Hungarian State Opera House (writer, director, producer)
2014: Szabadság tér'89 - animation inserts of a 103-part educational TV series commissioned by Hungarian Television (series director, producer)
2014: The Invisible Fortress - educational film commissioned by the Monastery Fortress (producer)
2014: Berry and Dolly - 13-part animated film series (series director, producer) 6th International Animation Festival, Xi'an, 2017 (special jury prize for the series).
2014: Berry and Dolly - Playmates  -  animated film (director, producer)
2014 KEDDvencek: KEDDconcerto - 13 parts, FAVORITES - 13 parts, KEDDcreative - 2x13 parts, KEDDkukta - 2x13 parts, KEDDmese - 2x13 parts, KEDD magician - 2x13 parts animated film series (producer)
2014: Opera130: The Boulevard Palace - educational film commissioned by the Hungarian State Opera House (writer, director, producer)
2015: Pocoyo - 3x52 part animated film series (Hungarian version producer)
2015: Paprika and Rose - 120-part animation series (producer)
2015: The Treasure of the Rhine - opera performance (director, visual designer), Hungarian State Opera House
2016: The Kuflis - animated film series, 2 episodes (producer)
2016: Bartók Marathon - The Wooden Prince, The Miraculous Mandarin, Bluebeard's Castle - total art production (director, visual designer)
2016: Walkür - opera performance (director, visual designer), Hungarian State Opera House
2017: Siegfried - opera performance (director, visual designer), Hungarian State Opera House
2017: The Kuflis - Animated Film Series, Episodes 3 - 13 (producer, co-director)
2018: Detti and Wire - animated film series, 2 episodes (producer)
2018: MiEzMiAz? - animated children's encyclopedia - 1-16. part (co-screenwriter, co-director, producer)
2018: Dúdoló - 50-part animated film series (producer)
2018: Prologue (composer. Iván Madarász) - total art production (director, visual designer)
2019: MATCHES - animated short film (writer, director, visual designer)
2019: What's new, kuflis? - animated film (co-director, producer)
2020: Berry and Dolly  4. - Fairy cards - 13 + 1 new tale - animated film (director, producer)
2020: MITCH-MATCH - animation series (writer, director, producer)

References

External links
http://www.imdb.com/name/nm1494496/
http://keddstudio.com/

1970 births
Living people
Hungarian animated film directors
Academic staff of the Moholy-Nagy University of Art and Design
Academics of the University of the Arts London
Place of birth missing (living people)